Mukul S. Anand (11 October 1951 – 7 September 1997) was an Indian film director and producer. He was the nephew of veteran film scriptwriter Inder Raj Anand and cousin of actor and director Tinnu Anand.

Career
Mukul S. Anand made his debut as a director with the suspense thriller Kanoon Kya Karega (1984), which was inspired by the Hollywood film Cape Fear. His second film Aitbaar (1985) was inspired by Alfred Hitchcock's classic Dial M for Murder. The film that first gained him recognition was the epic film Sultanat (1986), which brought together real-life father and son Dharmendra and Sunny Deol for the first time and introduced actress Juhi Chawla. That same year Anand also directed the thriller Main Balwan, which was known for the hit songs "Rock n Roll" and "Halla Gulla".

His first box-office success was Insaaf (1987), the film responsible for "re-introducing" Vinod Khanna to films after a hiatus. Anand's next film, Maha-Sangram (1990), reunited him with Vinod Khanna and was acclaimed for Aditya Pancholi's angry portrayal of a Thakur. At this point, Mukul was largely considered a skilful director, who held much promise but somehow never managed to deliver solid successes.

He finally  hit the big league with the Scarface-inspired crime thriller Agneepath (1990) with Amitabh Bachchan in the lead role, which won Amitabh a National Award for Best Actor. He was reunited with Bachchan for the family drama Hum (1991), which was a box-office success and featured the popular song "Jumma Chumma". He worked with Bachchan for the final time in the epic film Khuda Gawah (1992) which won him the Filmfare Best Director Award. His last completed film, Trimurti (1995), which had a multi-star cast including Jackie Shroff, Anil Kapoor and Shahrukh Khan, failed to do well at the box office.  The film he was working on at the time of his death in 1997 was Dus, which remained incomplete and unreleased, although the film's music did end up being released posthumously.

Personal life
Inder Raj Anand who was a film scriptwriter from the late 1940s through to the late 1980s was Mukul Anand's uncle. Mukul's cousin is actor and director Tinnu Anand. Mukul was married to Anita and had two children named Alishka and Mikhail. Daughter Aliksha Anand is married to producer, actor Romesh Sharma's son actor Karan Sharma who acted in the 2005 Bollywood film Dil Jo Bhi Kahey....

Death
Mukul died of a heart attack at the age of 45 on 7 September 1997. He was on location for action film Dus in Utah. The film began production in May 1997 and 40% of the shooting had been completed by August. It was never completed or released. Promo videos and clips of what Mukul had shot for the film were later seen on Mukul's official website.

In 2005, Nitin Manmohan who was the co-producer of Dus produced another unrelated film with the same title which was directed by Anubhav Sinha. Sanjay Dutt and Shilpa Shetty also starred in that film.

Filmography

Producer

References

External links

Mukul S. Anand Official Site
Mukul S. Anand @ SPICE

1951 births
1997 deaths
20th-century Indian film directors
Hindi-language film directors
Hindi film producers